Lloyd Olen "Sunshine" Parker (June 10, 1927 – February 17, 1999) was an American character actor. He is best known for his roles as Emmet in Road House and Edgar Deems in Tremors. He typically played minor roles as either a "bum" or an "old codger/geezer" stock character.

Death
Sunshine Parker died on February 17, 1999, in Burbank, California of pneumonia at the age of 71.

Filmography

Film
Hometown, USA (1979) - Derelict
Heart Beat (1980) - Gas Station Attendant
Oh, God! Book II (1980) - Railroad Station Derelict
Any Which Way You Can (1980) - Old Codger
Spittin Image (1982) - Pete
Cannery Row (1982) - Maxie "The Seer" Baker
Kiss My Grits (1983) - Old Geezer
The Sure Thing (1985) - Cowboy Guy
Pee-wee's Big Adventure (1985) - Hobo
Double Revenge (1988) - Old Drunkard
Sundown: The Vampire in Retreat (1989) - Merle
Road House (1989) - Emmet
Tremors (1990) - Edgar Deems
Love At Large (1990) - Ranch Foreman

TV
Bonanza (1969-1970) - Wally / Bum #1 / Charley-Boy
Little House on the Prairie (1974-1983) - Sheriff / Parley / Workman / Freight Man / Driver
Mr. Horn (1979) - Vern Laughoff
The Dukes of Hazzard (1979) - Sunshine
After MASH (1984) - The Vagrant / Derelict / Vagrant
The Adventures of Brisco County, Jr. (1993) - Stagecoach Driver #2
Love Street (1994) - Jack (final appearance)

References

External links

1927 births
1999 deaths
American male film actors
American male television actors
Male actors from Texas
Deaths from pneumonia in California
People from Taylor County, Texas
20th-century American male actors